John "Kruger" Fagan also known as Jackie Fagan, was an Irish football player and prominent member of the Shamrock Rovers team during the 1920s. He also played for the League of Ireland XI and Ireland. His son Paddy Fagan played for the Republic of Ireland in the 1950s and 1960s. They were the first father and son to play for an Ireland team selected by the FAI

Shamrock Rovers

Fagan came from the Markets area of Dublin and was just under  5'2"  in height. Sean Ryan refers to him as veteran of the Irish War of Independence. In 1922–23 he helped Shamrock Rovers win their first League of Ireland title. During the 1924–25 season, together with Bob Fullam, John Joe Flood and Billy Farrell, he formed part of a legendary forward-line known as the Four F's. He had a particular good partnership with Fullam. The season also saw Rovers win a League of Ireland, League of Ireland Shield and FAI Cup treble. They won the 1924–25 FAI Cup after beating Shelbourne 2-1 at Dalymount Park before an attendance of 25,000. Rovers went through the 1924–25 season undefeated and thus became the first side in the brief history of the League to win the title twice. Fagan also played and scored for Rovers in the 1925–26 FAI Cup final defeat to Fordsons. He helped Rovers win a third League of Ireland title in 1926–27. During the summer of 1929 he suffered a serious illness which effectively ended his Rovers career.  He left the club in December but shortly afterwards featured as a left half for Kingswood in the Leinster Senior League Second Division.

International career

League of Ireland XI

Between 1924 and 1927 Fagan also made five appearances for the League of Ireland XI. On 9 February 1924, he played in the selection first official game when they made their debut in a 3–3 draw against the Welsh Football League XI at Dalymount Park. Among his teammates were Frank Collins, Ernie MacKay, Bertie Kerr,  Dave Roberts, Johnny McIlroy and  Christy Robinson. Fagan provided two assists, with MacKay and Roberts both scoring from crosses he provided. On 13 March 1926 he also featured when the League of Ireland XI played the Irish League XI for the first time. His teammates this time included Collins, Frank Brady, Val Harris, Charlie Dowdall and the other three Four F's.  The League of Ireland XI won this game 3-1.

FAI XI

On 23 February 1924 Fagan also played for an FAI XI in a prestige friendly against Celtic. 18,000 turned up at Dalymount Park to see Celtic win 3-0. The game was used by the FAI to raise funds to help send a squad  to the 1924 Olympic Games. His teammates for this game included Jack McCarthy, Val Harris, Ernie MacKay and Charlie Dowdall.

Ireland

Fagan made his only appearance for Ireland in a 3-0 away defeat against Italy on 21 March 1926. His teammates on this occasion included Harry Cannon, Frank Brady, Jack McCarthy, Dinny Doyle, John Joe Flood  and Bob Fullam.

Honours
Shamrock Rovers

League of Ireland: 3
1922–23, 1924–25, 1926–27
FAI Cup: 1
1924–25
League of Ireland Shield: 2
1924–25, 1926–27
Leinster Senior Cup: 2
1923, 1927

References 

Republic of Ireland association footballers
Irish Free State international footballers
Shamrock Rovers F.C. players
League of Ireland players
League of Ireland XI players
People of the Irish War of Independence
Leinster Senior League (association football) players
Association football outside forwards
1900 births
1966 deaths